Victoria Regina Spivey (October 15, 1906 – October 3, 1976), sometimes known as Queen Victoria, was an American blues singer and songwriter. During a recording career that spanned 40 years, from 1926 to the mid-1960s, she worked with  Louis Armstrong, King Oliver, Clarence Williams, Luis Russell, Lonnie Johnson, and Bob Dylan. She also performed in vaudeville and clubs, sometimes with her sister Addie "Sweet Peas" (or "Sweet Pease") Spivey (August 22, 1910 – 1943), also known as the Za Zu Girl. Among her compositions are "Black Snake Blues" (1926), "Dope Head Blues" (1927), and "Organ Grinder Blues" (1928).

Life and career
Born in Houston, Texas, she was the daughter of Grant and Addie (Smith) Spivey.  Her father was a part-time musician and a flagman for the railroad; her mother was a nurse. She had three sisters, all three of whom also sang professionally: Leona, Elton "Za Zu",  and Addie "Sweet Peas" (or "Sweet Pease") Spivey (August 22, 19101943), who recorded for several major record labels between 1929 and 1937, and Elton Island Spivey Harris (1900–1971). She married four times; her husbands included Ruben Floyd, Billy Adams, and Len Kunstadt, with whom she co-founded Spivey Records in 1961.

Spivey's first professional experience was in a family string band led by her father in Houston. After he died, the seven-year-old Victoria played on her own at local parties. In 1918, she was hired to accompany films at the Lincoln Theater in Dallas. As a teenager, she worked in local bars, nightclubs, and buffet flats, mostly alone, but occasionally with singer-guitarists, including Blind Lemon Jefferson. In 1926 she moved to St. Louis, Missouri, where she was signed by Okeh Records. Her first recording, "Black Snake Blues" (1926), sold well, and her association with the label continued. She recorded numerous sides for Okeh in New York City until 1929, when she switched to the Victor label. Between 1931 and 1937, more recordings followed for Vocalion Records and Decca Records, and, working out of New York, she maintained an active performance schedule. Her recorded accompanists included King Oliver, Charles Avery, Louis Armstrong, Lonnie Johnson, and Red Allen.

The Depression did not put an end to Spivey's musical career. She found a new outlet for her talent in 1929, when the film director King Vidor cast her to play Missy Rose in his first sound film, Hallelujah!. Through the 1930s and 1940s Spivey continued to work in musical films and stage shows, including the hit musical Hellzapoppin (1938), often with her husband, the vaudeville dancer Billy Adams.

In 1951, Spivey retired from show business to play the pipe organ and lead a church choir, but she returned to secular music in 1961, when she was reunited with an old singing partner, Lonnie Johnson, to appear on four tracks on his Prestige Bluesville album Idle Hours.

The folk music revival of the 1960s gave her further opportunities to make a comeback. She recorded again for Prestige Bluesville, sharing an album, Songs We Taught Your Mother, with fellow veterans Alberta Hunter and Lucille Hegamin, and began making personal appearances at festivals and clubs, including the 1963 European tour of the American Folk Blues Festival.

In 1961, Spivey and the jazz and blues historian Len Kunstadt launched Spivey Records, a low-budget label dedicated to blues, jazz, and related music, prolifically recording established artists, including Sippie Wallace, Lucille Hegamin, Otis Rush, Otis Spann, Willie Dixon, Roosevelt Sykes, Big Joe Turner, Buddy Tate, and Hannah Sylvester, and also newer artists, including Luther Johnson, Brenda Bell, Washboard Doc, Bill Dicey, Robert Ross, Sugar Blue, Paul Oscher, Danny Russo, and Larry Johnson.

In March 1962, Spivey and Big Joe Williams recorded for Spivey Records, with harmonica accompaniment and backup vocals by Bob Dylan. The recordings were released on Three Kings and the Queen (Spivey LP 1004) and Kings and the Queen Volume Two (Spivey LP 1014). Dylan was listed under his own name on the record covers. A picture of her and Dylan from this period is shown on the back cover of the Dylan album, New Morning. In 1964, Spivey made her only recording with an all-white band, the Connecticut-based Easy Riders Jazz Band, led by the trombonist Big Bill Bissonnette. It was released first on an LP and later re-released on compact disc.

Spivey married four times; her husbands included Ruben Floyd, Billy Adams, and Len Kunstadt.

Spivey died in New York on October 3, 1976, at the age of 69, from an internal hemorrhage.

Selected discography

Albums
Idle Hours (Bluesville, 1961) with Lonnie Johnson (three tracks)
Songs We Taught Your Mother (Bluesville, 1962) shared album with Alberta Hunter and Lucille Hegamin (four tracks)
Woman Blues! (Bluesville, 1962) with Lonnie Johnson
A Basket of Blues (Spivey, 1962) shared album with Buddy Terry, Lucille Hegamin and Hannah Sylvester
Victoria and Her Blues (Spivey, 1962)
Three Kings and the Queen (Spivey, 1964) shared album with Roosevelt Sykes, Big Joe Williams and Lonnie Johnson
The Queen and Her Knights (Spivey, 1965) shared album with Lonnie Johnson, Little Brother Montgomery, Memphis Slim and Sonny Greer
 Music Down Home: An Introduction to Negro Folk Music, U.S.A. (1965)
 The Blues Is Life (1976)
 Classic Piano Blues from Smithsonian Folkways (2008)

78 rpm singles - Okeh Records

78 rpm singles - Victor Records

See also
Classic female blues
List of blues musicians
List of classic female blues singers
List of country blues musicians
List of vaudeville performers: L–Z
Spivey Records

References

Bibliography

External links
Victoria Spivey's record label 
Guide to the Victoria Spivey Collection, 1925-1940, 1961-1976, Institute of Jazz Studies, Rutgers University - Newark
Victoria Spivey papers, circa 1960–1976, Emory University Manuscript, Archives, and Rare Book Library
Victoria Spivey (1908-1976) on Red Hot Jazz Archive
Illustrated Spivey Records discography Stefan Wirz
Stuart A. Rose Manuscript, Archives, and Rare Book Library, Emory University: Victoria Spivey papers, circa 1960-1976
1960 interview with Paul Oliver

1906 births
1976 deaths
American blues pianists
American women pianists
American blues singers
Classic female blues singers
Vaudeville performers
Musicians from Houston
Vocalion Records artists
Deaths from bleeding
20th-century American singers
20th-century American women singers
20th-century American pianists